The art of Tamil painting had been taught in Sri Lankan art schools from the British colonial period, but in 1978, the Colonial Art School in Colombo changed its medium of instruction from Tamil to Sinhala.

Notable Tamil artists 
S. R. Kanagasabai, also called S.R.K., was an art teacher in northeast Sri Lanka. He founded the Vinsor Art Union in 1938 in the teachers' training college in Kopay. This union contributed to the development of painting until 1957.

Mark: After the death of S.R.K., the activities of Vinsor Art Union declined. During this period, the artist Mark, considered the pioneer of Tamil modern art in Sri Lanka, established the Holiday Art Union. Arunthathi Sabhanathan, Eugene Karunakaran, Ramalingham Sentitcumaran, Vasuki Jeganathan, Nirmala and Vaithehi were some of his students.

K.Kailasanathan, Nilanthan, and Sanathanan are some of the artists who became prominent in the 1980's.

References 

 Eelaththamilaridaye Melai Oviam by Dr.D.R.Konsanrynn in Kalaikkuralhal-of V.N.S Uthayachadran B.A(Cey), B.Ed(Cey).

Tamil art